George Herbert (1593–1633) was a Welsh poet and priest.

George Herbert may also refer to:

 George Herbert (MP for Monmouthshire), Member of Parliament (MP) for Monmouthshire
 George Herbert (MP for Glamorganshire) (died 1580), MP for Glamorganshire
 George Herbert, 2nd Earl of Powis (1755–1801), Anglo-Welsh peer
 George Herbert, 11th Earl of Pembroke (1759–1827), English peer
 George Herbert (priest) (1825–1894), Anglican priest, Dean of Hereford
 George Herbert, 13th Earl of Pembroke (1850–1895), English peer
 George Herbert, 4th Earl of Powis (1862–1952), British peer
 George Herbert, 5th Earl of Carnarvon (1866–1923), English Egyptologist
 Georges Hébert (1875-1957), pioneering physical educator
 George Herbert (politician) (1892–1982), British Conservative Party politician
 "Lord George Herbert", pseudonymous author and narrator of A Night in a Moorish Harem (1896)
 Michel Pêcheux (1938–1983), French philosopher, used the pseudonym "George Herbert" for his contributions to the journal Cahiers pour l'Analyse
 George Herbert, 8th Earl of Carnarvon (born 1956), British peer
 George Enrique Herbert (floreat 2001–2014), Belizean gang leader